The 2006 Algerian Super Cup is the  5th edition of Algerian Super Cup, a football match contested by the winners of the Championnat National and 2005–06 Algerian Cup competitions. The match was scheduled to be played on 1 November 2006 at Stade 5 Juillet 1962 in Algiers between 2005-06 Championnat National winners JS Kabylie and 2005–06 Algerian Cup winners MC Alger.

Match details

References 

2006
Supercup
JS Kabylie matches